Del Rio is an unincorporated, urban community in Hillsborough County, Florida, United States. It lies between Tampa and Temple Terrace, near the Hillsborough River.  

The community is known as "The Fishbowl" to locals because many streets in the area are named for fish. Del Rio is included within the East Lake-Orient Park census-designated place.

Description

Del Rio is bounded by Tampa to the west, the Hillsborough River to the north, U.S. Route 92 to the south, and 56th Street (SR 583) to the east.

History
Del Rio was a purpose-built community created in the 1950s and 1960s as one of the suburbs of Tampa. The community grew rapidly during the 1960s and 1970s. Its peak population according to the Census was 8,248 in 1990.

Schools serving the area
Robles Elementary School
C. Leon King High School

References

Unincorporated communities in Hillsborough County, Florida
Former census-designated places in Hillsborough County, Florida
Unincorporated communities in Florida
Former census-designated places in Florida